Weapons That Made Britain is a 2004 TV documentary series  broadcast on Channel 4 in the UK.

It was made by independent production company Lion Television (now part of All3media) for Channel 4. It was presented by film fight coordinator and medieval weapons trainer, Mike Loades. The Executive Producer across the series was Bill Locke.

The 5 × 1 hour series explores different weapons and defensive technologies related to key historical events. Throughout the programmes, Mike Loades, visits pivotal battlefields, historical buildings and museums and talks with historians and weapons specialists. The series included re-enactments and scientific experiments to test some of the principal weapons, defensive tools and armour of medieval Britain.

Episodes

Episode 1: Sword
Producer and Director Tanya Cheadle
Episode 2: The Longbow
Producer and Director Sabine Pusch
Episode 3: The Lance 
Producer and Director George Pagliero
Episode 4: Shield 
Producer and Director Peter Sommer
Episode 5: Armour
Producer and Director Tom McCarthy

References

External links
 

Mike Loades

2000s British documentary television series
British television documentaries
Channel 4 documentary series
English-language television shows
2004 British television series debuts
2004 British television series endings
Television series by All3Media